Ironclad is a horizontally scrolling shooter developed by Saurus for the Neo Geo CD video game console.

Gameplay

Development and release 
Ironclad was never officially released in North America, but if the game is put on a North American system, the game will be playable in English and display the "Ironclad" title screen. It was re-released by D4 Enterprise for Wii via the Virtual Console in Japan on November 24, 2009, in PAL regions on March 12, 2010, and in North America on April 5, 2010. A port for Microsoft Windows, OS X, Linux and asm.js developed by DotEmu was released by SNK Playmore as part of the Humble NEOGEO 25th Anniversary Bundle on December 15, 2015. The game was later released on GOG.com on October 5, 2017.

Reception 

In 2014, HobbyConsolas identified Ironclad as one of the twenty best games for the Neo Geo CD.

Notes

References

Further reading

External links 
 Ironclad at GameFAQs
 Ironclad at Giant Bomb
 Ironclad at Killer List of Videogames
 Ironclad at MobyGames

1996 video games
Cancelled arcade video games
Cooperative video games
Horizontally scrolling shooters
Multiplayer and single-player video games
D4 Enterprise games
Neo Geo games
Neo Geo CD games
Saurus games
Shoot 'em ups
SNK games
SNK Playmore games
Virtual Console games
Video games developed in Japan